Michael Luwoye (born December 19, 1990) is an American actor of Nigerian descent, known for playing the title role in the Broadway musical Hamilton. In 2022, was nominated for the Children's and Family Emmy Award for Outstanding Voice Performance in a Preschool Animated Program for his role in Baby Shark's Big Show!.

Early life and education 
Michael Luwoye was born in Huntsville, Alabama, the youngest of four children born to immigrants from Nigeria who settled in Alabama in the 1980s. His mother was an engineer, and his father became the owner of a wholesale ice cream distribution business.

An artistic child, Luwoye drew and wrote journals, and learned to play guitar. He learned music theory and composition while attending Lee High School in Huntsville.

He became interested in theatre during his junior year at the University of Alabama. While in college, he played Queequeg in Moby Dick, the title role in Othello, Hud in Hair, and Joe in Show Boat.

Luwoye received his B.A. from the University of Alabama in 2013, and moved to New York in September that year.

Acting career

Regional and off-Broadway 
In regional theatre, Luwoye has performed in Cardboard Piano (Actors Theatre of Louisville, 2016), Marley (Center Stage, 2015), Witness Uganda (American Repertory Theater, 2014), Tick, Tick... Boom! (American Theater Group), and The Three Musketeers and Once on This Island (Flat Rock Playhouse).

Luwoye's off-Broadway stage debut was in the Second Stage Theater production of Invisible Thread, for which he received a 2016 Lucille Lortel Award nomination for Outstanding Lead Actor in a Musical.

Hamilton 
In 2016, Luwoye auditioned for the role of Hercules Mulligan in the Broadway production of Hamilton, but unexpectedly was offered the title role. He began rehearsals June 14, 2016, and took over on August 2, 2016 as the alternate to Javier Muñoz for the role of Alexander Hamilton, following Lin-Manuel Miranda's departure from the show. Luwoye became the first black actor to take on the role of Hamilton.

He was also the understudy for the role of Aaron Burr, which he first performed two months later, on October 4, 2016. On November 16, 2016, Luwoye notably played Hamilton at a matinee and Burr in the evening on the same day.

Luwoye was given the title role in Hamiltons national touring company, beginning in March 2017 with a 21-week engagement in San Francisco, followed by 21 weeks in Los Angeles, concluding at the Pantages Theatre on December 30, 2017.

Luwoye returned to Broadway in the title role of Hamilton on January 16, 2018. His last performance was February 17, 2019.

Television 
In November 2017, Luwoye appeared in an episode of Curb Your Enthusiasm called "The Shucker", in which he was shown playing the role of Alexander Hamilton in Hamilton. Additionally, he played Hades in an episode of The Magicians on SYFY.

In September 2018, he was signed for a guest voice role in the third season of Disney Junior's animated series The Lion Guard as Askari, the founder and leader of the original Lion Guard.

In 2019, he was cast in a supporting role on NBC's Bluff City Law.

Theatre credits

References

External links
 

1990 births
21st-century American male actors
American male musical theatre actors
American male singers
American male stage actors
American male television actors
American people of Nigerian descent
Living people